Hirnytsky District is an urban district of the city of Makiivka, Ukraine.

References 

Makiivka